The Middlebury River is a tributary river of Otter Creek in Addison County, Vermont. Three branches feed the river from origins in Green Mountain National Forest. The river passes through Ripton, Middlebury and Salisbury.

References 

Rivers of Vermont